Kibaha Secondary School is a Tanzanian all-boys secondary school located in Kibaha, Kibaha District, Pwani Region.

History and operations
It was established in 1965.

With a capacity of 612 students, the school admitted the first intake of form one and five students in 1965. By 30 March 1999, the school had a total enrollment of 771.

The school is an institution admitting academically gifted young people from all over Tanzania.

CSEE results
(Certificate of Secondary Education Examination)

ACSEE results

Notable alumni 
Jakaya Mrisho Kikwete, President of Tanzania.
Lazaro Nyalandu, Former Minister Natural Resources and Tourism

See also

 Education in Tanzania
 List of schools in Tanzania

References

External links
Kibaha Education Centre

1964 establishments in Tanzania
Boys' schools in Tanzania
Buildings and structures in the Pwani Region
Educational institutions established in 1964
Secondary schools in Tanzania